Karakhtia nessovi is a species of  Proarticulate from the Ediacaran period, around 555 Million Years Ago. K. nessovi is the only species in the genus Karakhtia. The genus Haootia has been compared minorly to Karakhtia in the way that the fossils of Haootia superficially resemble the crumpled margins of Karakhtia.

See also

 Vendiamorpha
 Vendia
 List of ediacaran genera

References

Vendiamorpha
Ediacaran life
Ediacaran
Proarticulata
Enigmatic prehistoric animal genera
Taxa described in 2004